The Marathon du Mont Blanc (Mont Blanc Marathon) is an annual marathon distance (42.195 km) alpine trail running event held in Chamonix, France. The Marathon du Mont Blanc race is the titular event but the name also refers to the group of longer and shorter distance races one or more of which competitors can compete in over a three-day period starting on the last Friday in June.

The marathon was first run in June 2003, however the shorter distance 23km du Mont-Blanc, which utilizes part of the same route as the marathon, has been run annually since 1979.

Overview
The 23km du Mont-Blanc (formerly the "Cross du Mont-Blanc") was founded by Georges Costaz, the President of the Club alpin français Chamonix (CAF) in 1979. In 2003, on the 25th anniversary of the first running, the Marathon du Mont Blanc event was added to the race schedule. The following year the 10 km du Mont-Blanc event was added and in 2011 the KM Vertical (3.8 km) was also included. In order to meet the requirements for hosting the Skyrunning World Championships in 2014 the 80 km du Mont-Blanc was added to the race schedule as a test event in 2013. The event also offers the "Mini Cross" (800m to 3 km) for 7 to 15-year-old competitors.

The race is currently administered by Club des sports de Chamonix.

Races

KM Vertical du Mont-Blanc 
Distance: 3.8 km
Total Ascent: 1,000m
Start Time: 14:00
Course cut-off: N/A
Number of entries: Unknown

10km du Mont-Blanc 
Distance: 10 km
Total Ascent: 325m
Start Time: 13:00
Course cut-off: Unknown
Number of entries: 1,500

23km du Mont-Blanc 
Distance: 23 km
Total Ascent: 1,665m
Start Time: 08:00
Course cut-off: 5 hours
Number of entries: 1,000

Marathon du Mont-Blanc 
Distance: 42 km
Total Ascent: 2,730m
Start Time: 07:00
Course cut-off: 9 hours
Number of entries: 2,000

80km du Mont-Blanc 
Distance: 83.7 km (2014)
Total Ascent: 6,026m
Start Time: 04:00
Course cut-off: 24 hours
Number of entries: 1,000
Course Description: Starting on the Place de l'Église in Central Chamonix the route climbs via Refuge de Bel Lachat to Le Brévent (2,525m), the runners then descend to Plan Praz. From Plan Praz the course traverses the Aiguilles Rouges to La Flégère and via Lac des Chéserys and Col de Montets to Le Buet (1,330m).
From Buet the trail climbs around 1,300m to the Col du Corbeau (2,602m) and then descends via Col du Passet and Chalets de la Loriaz to Vallorcine (1,260m).
From Vallorcine the route climbs steeply via Col des Posettes to Aiguillette des Posettes (2,201m) before descending just as steeply via Le Tour and Argentière to Les Bois (1,083m).
The trail then makes the last major ascent via Les Mottets and Gare du Montenvers to Signal (2,200m) where the runners traverse to Refuge du plan de l’aiguille (also 2,200m) before descending to the finish in Chamonix.

Duo étoilé
Distance: 17 km 
Total Ascent: 1,315m
Start Time: 21:00
Course cut-off: 4:30 hours
Course Description: Starting from the center of Chamonix, the first kilometers will lead you to the Arveyron before taking the path of the crystalliers to join the Planards and the path leading to the alpine pastures of Blaitière. From there you will continue in direction of the refuge of the Plan of the Aiguille (2,207m) before descending on Chamonix by the same way as the 80km of the Mont Blanc.

Results

The winners of the Mont Blanc Marathon have been as follows.

See also
Trail running
Ultramarathon
Ultra-Trail du Mont-Blanc

References

External links
 
 Official web site - (main language: French, but also available in English)
 Press kit on the official web site (PDF)

Trail running competitions
Marathons in France
Mont Blanc
Skyrunning competitions
Skyrunner World Series
Mountain marathons
2003 establishments in France
Recurring sporting events established in 2003
Sport in Chamonix
Golden Trail Series
Athletics competitions in France
Vertical kilometer running competitions